See You Around is the debut album of I'm With Her, a musical supergroup made up of Aoife O'Donovan, Sarah Jarosz, and Sara Watkins.

See You Around was recorded at Real World Studios in Bath, Somerset, England, three weeks after they had written it. The album was co-produced with Ethan Johns and released on February 16, 2018. The group toured in the U.S. and in Europe in the first half of 2018 to promote the album.

Track listing

References

Bluegrass albums
Progressive bluegrass albums